253, or Tube Theatre, is a novel by Canadian writer Geoff Ryman, originally created as a website in 1997, then published as a print book titled 253: The Print Remix in 1998. The print version won a Philip K. Dick Award.

Synopsis
253 is about the 253 people on a London Underground train travelling between Embankment station and Elephant & Castle on January 11, 1995. The basic structure of the novel is explained in the foreword:

Each character is introduced in a separate section containing 253 words, which give general details and describe the thoughts going through the characters' heads. In the online version, hypertext links lead to other characters who are nearby or who have some connection to the current character; in the print version, the links are partly replaced by a traditional index. The reader can proceed from one character to another using these devices or can read the novel in positional order, e.g. from one seat and one train car to the next, but there is no overall chronological order except in the final section.

The novel ends with the train crashing.

Interpretations
Ryman states that the meaning of 253 is dramatically changed when read in digital form as opposed to print form. In reading 253 on the internet the links between passengers create and emphasize existing similarities between the passengers. It becomes a text about how intrinsically similar people are. Whereas, in print form 253 is about how different people are. A lack of links between passengers means that the reader must traverse the story linearly, thereby emphasizing the differences between passengers.

Reception
Charles de Lint gave the print edition a mixed review, declaring: "Is it worth reading? Definitely. Is it the fiction of the future? I hope not. As a one-off, it's entertaining, and even thought-provoking, but it took me a long time to read, simply because I kept setting it aside after every half-dozen or so entries to read something with a more coherent narrative. Call me old-fashioned, but I doubt I'd try another." NPR's Mary Glendinning reviewed the print version more favourably as "Gimmicky? Perhaps. Funny, sharp and sad? Yes. Entertaining? Definitely."

See also

 Constrained writing
 Electronic literature
 Hypertext fiction
 Life: A User's Manual, a similarly constructed novel by Georges Perec, based on an apartment building rather than an underground train
 List of London Underground-related fiction

Notes

External links
 Hypertext version
 253: The Print Remix at Worlds Without End

Novels by Geoff Ryman
1996 British novels
1996 science fiction novels
Novels set on the London Underground
Fiction set in 1995
Flamingo books
Novels set in one day